Luasa Batungile (born 17 September 1967) is a Congolese sprinter. He competed in the men's 4 × 400 metres relay at the 1992 Summer Olympics.

References

External links
 

1967 births
Living people
Athletes (track and field) at the 1992 Summer Olympics
Democratic Republic of the Congo male sprinters
Olympic athletes of the Democratic Republic of the Congo
Place of birth missing (living people)
21st-century Democratic Republic of the Congo people